Machete fencing may refer to:
Colombian grima in Colombia
Juego del garrote in Venezuela
Tire machèt in Haiti